The Bình Di River is distributary of the river Bassac and runs between Cambodia and Vietnam. It flows  through An Giang Province.

Rivers of An Giang province
Rivers of Vietnam